Gustav Adolf Church, also known as Iisalmi Old Church, is a wooden church in Iisalmi, Finland, which was consecrated in 1780. The Finnish Heritage Agency has classified the church as a nationally significant built cultural environment. Prior to the union of municipalities and parishes in the early 1970s, the Gustav Adolf Church was the main church of the Iisalmi rural parish, while the town parish used a new church completed in 1934. The church was to be named after the then Swedish heir to the crown, Gustav Adolf, and the use of the name was approved by the ruler later in the autumn.

History 

The Gustav Adolf Church is the third church building in the history of the parish; the first church was destroyed in a fire in 1700 and the second was demolished due to its poor condition after the present church was completed. The church was consecrated by Pastor Johan Lagus on March 5, 1780.

According to the memorial plaque of the churches attached to the belfry, the belfry dates from 1700. According to the source, the belfry dates back to the middle of the 18th century, but the exact year of construction is unknown. In 1752, the belfry was tarred under the direction of master builder Anders Brovall, and painted by Mikael Toppelius in 1756. 

The church has been renovated several times. In 1876, the church was renovated in terms of interior and exterior architecture and interior design in accordance with a proposal made by architect F. A. Sjöström, when, among other things, the inner vault was demolished. In 1927, the church was altered and the interior was renovated according to plans of architect Rafael Blomstedt. Since then, the changes made in the church have been minor.

See also 
 Holy Cross Church, Iisalmi

Sources

References

External links 

 Gustav Adolf Church at Iisalmen seurakunta (in Finnish)

Buildings of Iisalmi
Churches completed in 1780
Lutheran churches in Finland